Pirate Gold is a 1913 film starring Blanche Sweet and featuring Harry Carey.

Cast
 Blanche Sweet - The Daughter
 Charles Hill Mailes - The Father
 J. Jiquel Lanoe - The Successful Suitor
 Hector Sarno - The Miscreant Sailor (as Hector V. Sarno)
 W. Chrystie Miller - The Old Mate
 Harry Carey
 Donald Crisp
 Joseph McDermott - In Crew
 Wallace Reid

See also
 Harry Carey filmography
 Blanche Sweet filmography

References

External links

1913 films
American silent short films
Biograph Company films
American black-and-white films
Films directed by Wilfred Lucas
1913 short films
1910s American films